Abitare, published monthly in Milan, Italy, is one of the world's best known design magazines. It was first published in 1961.

History and profile
Abitare was launched in Milan in 1961 by Piera Peroni. The magazine was published monthly. It was devoted to architecture, interior design, furniture, product design and graphic arts and was published both in Italian and English. In 1976 the magazine was sold to Segesta Publishing group. Later it became part of the RCS Group and began to be published by RCS Mediagroup.

Shortly after the founding of the magazine, the influential postwar architect, Eugenio Gentili Tedeschi joined Peroni and, in addition to writing for the magazine, later served as acting de facto editor in chief with Franca Santi. Many known architects and designers were contributors to Abitare. Stefano Boeri and Maria Giulia Zunino were among the editors-in-chief of the magazine. Chiara Maranzana and Mario Piazza also served as the editors-in-chief of Abitare.

The magazine momentarily ceased publication in March 2014. However, its online version continued to publish content. The magazine was relaunched in October 2014 with a new format and new graphics under the direction of Silvia Botti.

See also
List of magazines published in Italy

References

External links
Official website

1961 establishments in Italy
Architecture magazines
Design magazines
English-language magazines
Italian-language magazines
Magazines established in 1961
Magazines published in Milan
Monthly magazines published in Italy